SoRI-9409 is a mixed mu opioid receptor partial agonist and delta opioid receptor antagonist, used in biomedical research. It produces moderate analgesic effects without development of tolerance and with reduced withdrawal symptoms compared to standard opioid analgesics, as well as showing anti-addictive effects that may be useful in the treatment of alcoholism.

References 

Delta-opioid receptor antagonists
4,5-Epoxymorphinans
Mu-opioid receptor agonists
Phenols
Semisynthetic opioids